Whom the Moon a Nightsong Sings is a compilation album by various neofolk and metal artists. It was released through Prophecy Productions on October 29, 2010. Artists featured on the compilation album include Ulver, Nest, Syven, Les Discrets, Neun Welten, Nucleus Torn, Orplid, Tenhi, and Havnatt.

Track listing

References

External links 
 Prophecy Productions
 Whom the Moon a Nightsong Sings on Rate Your Music

2010 compilation albums
Dornenreich albums
Empyrium albums
Nest (band) albums
Tenhi albums
Ulver albums